Jonquil Fiona Williams,  (born 22 July 1947) is a British retired academic of social policy whose research covers gender, race, ethnicity, and the welfare state. From 1996 to 2012, she was Professor of Social Policy at the University of Leeds. She was previously a lecturer at the Polytechnic of North London, Plymouth Polytechnic, and the Open University, before becoming Professor of Applied Social Studies at the University of Bradford.

Early life and education
Williams was born on 22 July 1947 in Rugby, Warwickshire, England, to Celia and Leonard Williams. She was educated at Ilkley Grammar School, a state grammar school in Ilkley, Yorkshire. She studied sociology and social administration at Bedford College, London, graduating with a Bachelor of Science (BSc) degree in 1968. In later life, she studied for a Doctor of Philosophy (PhD) degree with the Open University, which she completed in 1993.

Academic career
From 1968 to 1970, Williams was a Commonwealth Scholar at the University of Ibadan in Nigeria. Having returned to the United Kingdom, she was a part-time lecturer at Kilburn Polytechnic from 1970 to 1972 and a lecturer at the Polytechnic of North London from 1972 to 1975. After a break from academia, she joined Plymouth Polytechnic where she was a part-time lecturer between 1981 and 1985, and a research officer from 1985 to 1987. She was a research officer at Leeds Polytechnic during the 1987/1988 academic year.

In 1988, Williams joined the Open University; she was a lecturer from 1988 to 1992 and a senior lecturer from 1992 to 1995. For the 1995/1996 academic year, she was Professor of Applied Social Studies at the University of Bradford. In 1996, she joined the University of Leeds having been appointed Professor of Social Policy and remained there until she retired. She was Director of the Economic and Social Research Council (ESRC) Research Group on "Care, Values and the Future of Welfare" between 1999 and 2005. In 2012, she retired from full-time academia and was appointed a professor emeritus.

Williams has led an active retirement. Since 2012, she has been a research associate of the Centre on Migration, Policy and Society at the University of Oxford, She continued to be co-editor of the academic journal Social Politics: International Studies in Gender, State and Society until 2014. Since 2014, she has been an honorary professor of the Social Policy Research Centre, University of New South Wales.

Personal life
Williams has two children: a daughter and a son.

Honours
In 2003, Williams was elected a Fellow of the Academy of Social Sciences (FAcSS). In the 2004 New Year Honours, she was appointed an Officer of the Order of the British Empire (OBE) "for services to social policy". In 2016, she was elected a Fellow of the British Academy (FBA), the United Kingdom's national academy for the humanities and social sciences.

Selected works

References

1947 births
Living people
Academics of social policy
Academics of the University of Leeds
Officers of the Order of the British Empire
Fellows of the British Academy
Fellows of the Academy of Social Sciences
People educated at Ilkley Grammar School
Alumni of Bedford College, London
Alumni of the Open University
Academic staff of the University of Ibadan
Academics of the University of North London
Academics of the University of Plymouth
Academics of Leeds Beckett University
Academics of the Open University
Academics of the University of Bradford
People from Rugby, Warwickshire